The Triumph of Labour, also known as the Labour statue, is a statue at the Marina Beach, Chennai, India. Erected at the northern end of the beach at the Anna Square opposite University of Madras, it is an important landmark of Chennai. The statue shows four men toiling to move a rock, depicting the hard work of the labouring class. It was sculpted by Debi Prasad Roy Chowdhury. The statue is the earliest one to be erected on the beach and is installed close to the site where the country's first commemoration of May Day was held. The statue was installed on the eve of the Republic Day in 1959, as part of the Kamaraj government's drive to beautify the beach. The statue remains the focal point of May Day celebrations in the city.

History

On a summer evening in May 1923, M. Singaravelu, a labour union leader, conducted a meeting at the Marina Beach near Triplicane, calling for recognition of workers' rights, and pledged to create a political party to represent the rights of labourers, which was India's first ever May Day rally. To commemorate this, the Labour statue, depicting an inspiring posture of a team of labourers engrossed at arduous work, was sculpted by Debi Prasad Roy Chowdhury, who was the first Indian principal of the then Government of Madras School of Arts and Crafts (what is today the Tamil Nadu Government College of Fine Arts) and was erected on 25 January 1959, unveiled by the then Governor of Madras, Bishnuram Medhi.

A.P. Srinivasan, a night watchman at the School of Arts and Crafts, was the model for second and fourth men from the left while Ramu, a student modeled for the other two men.

See also

 Marina Beach

References

Public art
Monuments and memorials in Chennai
Labour in India
Labor monuments and memorials